Marit van Eupen (born 26 September 1969 in Arnhem) is a rower from the Netherlands.

Together with Kirsten van der Kolk she participated at the 2000 Summer Olympics in Sydney where they finished in sixth position in the lightweight double sculls. Four years later they took part in Athens at the 2004 Summer Olympics where they won the bronze medal. After those Olympics they became World Champion in 2005 (Gifu, 2006 (Eton and 2007 (Munich. In 2008 they became second in the Rowing World Cup meeting in Luzern and they qualified themselves for the 2008 Summer Olympics where they won Olympic Gold.

In 2006 van Eupen received the "Golden Oar" first awarded to Janus Ooms in 1892. Between 2005 and 2008, three years in a row, she was given the Amsterdam Sportswoman of the year award.

References

External links
 
 
 

1969 births
Living people
Dutch female rowers
Rowers at the 2000 Summer Olympics
Rowers at the 2004 Summer Olympics
Rowers at the 2008 Summer Olympics
Olympic rowers of the Netherlands
Olympic gold medalists for the Netherlands
Olympic bronze medalists for the Netherlands
Sportspeople from Arnhem
Olympic medalists in rowing
Medalists at the 2008 Summer Olympics
World Rowing Championships medalists for the Netherlands
Medalists at the 2004 Summer Olympics
21st-century Dutch women
20th-century Dutch women